Augusta Maria "Mici" Teller (originally Schütz-Harkányi; 30 April 1909 – 4 June 2000) was a Hungarian-American scientist and computer programmer, involved in the development of the Metropolis algorithm.

Life and career
Teller was born as Auguszta Mária Harkányi in Hungary, the daughter of Ella/Gabriella (Weiser) and Ede Harkányi, originally Hirsch Sámuel. Her parents were Jewish, but had converted to Christianity. Known as "Mici," she and her brother, Ede, were adopted by their foster father after their biological father's death, who gave them their second last name. In 1924, Ede "Szuki" Schütz-Harkányi introduced Mici to his childhood friend, Edward Teller, who would become her future husband and an important scientist for the Manhattan Project.

In 1931, Mici earned her teacher's diploma after studying mathematics at the University of Budapest.

During 1932–1933, Mici spent two years at the University of Pittsburgh with a scholarship to study sociology and psychology earning her Masters in Personnel Work in 1933. When she returned to Hungary, she married her longtime friend, Teller, on February 24, 1934. The Tellers emigrated to the United States in 1935, after Russian-born physicist George Gamow invited Edward to teach at the George Washington University. She and her husband became American citizens on March 6, 1941. The Tellers had two children: Paul and Wendy.

In April 1943, Mici joined Edward at Los Alamos National Laboratory. There, she worked in the computations division part-time along with other wives of Los Alamos scientists and workers. The group fell under the Theoretical Division headed by physicist Hans Bethe.

In the late 1940s, the Teller family moved from Los Alamos, New Mexico to Chicago so they could work at Argonne National Laboratory. Mici wrote an early version of the code for the MANIAC I computer. She also was a co-author of the first paper introducing Markov chain Monte Carlo simulation, though the final code used in the publication was written in entirety by Arianna Rosenbluth.

The Tellers made a final move in the 1950s to California. At 91, on June 4, 2000, Augusta "Mici" Teller died from lung disease.

References

External links
 'Marshall Rosenbluth and the Metropolis algorithm', J. E. Gubernatis, Physics of Plasmas 12, 057303 (2005); doi: https://dx.doi.org/10.1063/1.1887186 
Atomic Heritage Foundation biography

1909 births
2000 deaths
American nuclear physicists
Monte Carlo methodologists
Hungarian women computer scientists
Women nuclear physicists
Hungarian emigrants to the United States
University of Pittsburgh School of Social Work alumni
Los Alamos National Laboratory personnel
Argonne National Laboratory people
Budapest University alumni